Gerald F. McMonagle (born May 19, 1936) is a former Democratic member of the Pennsylvania House of Representatives.

References

Democratic Party members of the Pennsylvania House of Representatives
1936 births
Living people